Cocagne is a 1961 French-Italian comedy film directed by Maurice Cloche and starring Fernandel, Dora Doll and Leda Gloria. A simple man unexpectedly gains enormous fame as a celebrated artist, to the scepticism of his family and friends.

It was shot at the Billancourt Studios in Paris with location shooting in Arles and the Camargue. The film's sets were designed by the art director Jacques Paris.

Cast
 Fernandel as Marc-Antoine 
 Dora Doll as Hélène 
 Leda Gloria as Mélanie 
 Rellys as Septime 
 Andrex as Amedee 
 René Génin as Mathias 
 Paul Préboist as Banane 
 Edmond Ardisson as Un collègue de Marc-Antoine 
 Paul Boussard as Claude 
 José Casa as Un collègue de Marc-Antoine 
 Jean Franval as Un habitué du bistrot 
 Marie-Thérèse Izar as Augusta 
 Josette Jordan as Mireille 
 Julien Maffre as Le facteur 
 Léon Zitrone as himself 
 Memmo Carotenuto as Mauricio, le cinéaste 
 Roberto Risso as Vincente 
 Marie-Therese Eicholtzer as Louise 
 Pierre Mirat as Le docteur

References

Bibliography 
 Goble, Alan. The Complete Index to Literary Sources in Film. Walter de Gruyter, 1999.

External links 
 

1961 comedy films
Italian comedy films
1961 films
1960s French-language films
French comedy films
Films directed by Maurice Cloche
Films shot at Billancourt Studios
Films set in France
1960s French films
1960s Italian films